Donald McNichol Sutherland  (born 17 July 1935) is a Canadian actor whose film career spans over six decades. He has been nominated for nine Golden Globe Awards, winning two for his performances in the television films Citizen X (1995) and Path to War (2002); the former also earned him a Primetime Emmy Award. An inductee of the Hollywood Walk of Fame and Canadian Walk of Fame, he also received a Canadian Academy Award for the drama film Threshold (1981). Multiple film critics and media outlets have cited him as one of the best actors never to have received an Academy Award nomination. In 2017, he received an Academy Honorary Award for his contributions to cinema. In 2021, he won the Critics' Choice Television Award for Best Supporting Actor in a Movie/Miniseries for his work in the HBO miniseries The Undoing (2020).

Sutherland rose to fame after starring in films including The Dirty Dozen (1967), M*A*S*H (1970), Kelly's Heroes (1970), Klute (1971), Don't Look Now (1973), Fellini's Casanova (1976), 1900 (1976), The Eagle Has Landed (1976), Animal House (1978), Invasion of the Body Snatchers (1978), Ordinary People (1980), and Eye of the Needle (1981). He later went on to star in many other films where he appeared either in leading or supporting roles such as A Dry White Season (1989), JFK (1991), Outbreak (1995), A Time to Kill (1996), The Assignment (1997), Without Limits (1998), Space Cowboys (2000), Big Shot's Funeral (2001), The Italian Job (2003), Cold Mountain (2003), Pride & Prejudice (2005), Aurora Borealis (2006), The Mechanic (2011) and The Hunger Games franchise (2012–2015).

He is the father of actors Kiefer Sutherland, Rossif Sutherland, and Angus Sutherland.

Early life
Sutherland was born 17 July 1935, in Saint John, New Brunswick, the son of Dorothy Isobel (née McNichol; 1892–1956) and Frederick McLea Sutherland (1894–1983), who worked in sales and ran the local gas, electricity and bus company. He is of Scottish, German and English ancestry. As a child, he had rheumatic fever, hepatitis, and poliomyelitis. His teenage years were spent in Bridgewater, Nova Scotia. He obtained his first part-time job, at the age of 14, as a news correspondent for local radio station CKBW.

Sutherland graduated from Bridgewater High School. He then studied at Victoria University, an affiliated college of the University of Toronto, where he met his first wife Lois May Hardwick (not to be confused with the child star of the same name Lois Ann Hardwick), and graduated with a double major in engineering and drama. He had at one point been a member of the "UC Follies" comedy troupe in Toronto. He changed his mind about becoming an engineer, and left Canada for Britain in 1957, studying at the London Academy of Music and Dramatic Art.

Career

Early work
After departing the London Academy of Music and Dramatic Art (LAMDA), Sutherland spent a year and a half at the Perth Repertory Theatre in Scotland.

In the early to mid-1960s, Sutherland began to gain small roles in British films and TV (such as a hotel receptionist in The Sentimental Agent episode "A Very Desirable Plot" (1963)). He was featured alongside Christopher Lee in horror films such as Castle of the Living Dead (1964) and Dr. Terror's House of Horrors (1965). He also had a supporting role in the Hammer Films production Die! Die! My Darling! (1965), with Tallulah Bankhead and Stefanie Powers. In the same year, he appeared in the Cold War classic The Bedford Incident and in the TV series Gideon's Way, in the 1966 episode "The Millionaire's Daughter". In 1966, Sutherland appeared in the BBC TV play Lee Oswald-Assassin, playing a friend of Lee Harvey Oswald, Charles Givens (even though Givens himself was an African American). He also appeared in the TV series The Saint, in the 1965 episode "The Happy Suicide".

In 1967, he appeared in "The Superlative Seven", an episode of The Avengers. He also made a second, and more substantial appearance in The Saint. The episode, "Escape Route", which was directed by the show's star, Roger Moore, who later recalled Sutherland "asked me if he could show it to some producers as he was up for an important role... they came to view a rough cut and he got The Dirty Dozen." The film, which starred Lee Marvin, Charles Bronson, and a number of other popular actors, was the 5th highest-grossing film of 1967 and MGM's highest-grossing movie of the year.

In 1968, after the breakthrough in the UK-filmed The Dirty Dozen, Sutherland left London for Hollywood. He then appeared in two war films, playing the lead role as "Hawkeye" Pierce in Robert Altman's MASH in 1970; and, again in 1970, as hippie tank commander "Oddball" in Kelly's Heroes.

Mid-career: 1972–2000
Sutherland starred with Gene Wilder in the 1970 comedy Start the Revolution Without Me. During the filming of the Academy Award-winning detective thriller Klute, Sutherland had an intimate relationship with co-star Jane Fonda. Sutherland and Fonda went on to co-produce and star together in the anti–Vietnam War documentary F.T.A. (1972), consisting of a series of sketches performed outside army bases in the Pacific Rim and interviews with American troops who were then on active service. A follow up to their teaming up in Klute, Sutherland and Fonda performed together in Steelyard Blues (1973), a "freewheeling, Age-of-Aquarius, romp-and-roll caper" from the writer David S. Ward.

Sutherland found himself as a leading man throughout the 1970s in films such as the Venice-based psychological horror film Don't Look Now (1973), co-starring Julie Christie, a role which saw him nominated for the BAFTA Award for Best Actor, the war film The Eagle Has Landed (1976), Federico Fellini's Casanova (1976) and the thriller Eye of the Needle (which was filmed on location on the Isle of Mull, West Scotland). His role as Corpse of Lt. Robert Schmied in the Maximilian Schell-directed German film End of the Game (1976) is listed in crazy credits, and as the health inspector in the science fiction/horror film Invasion of the Body Snatchers (1978) alongside Brooke Adams and Jeff Goldblum.

He helped launch the internationally popular Canadian television series Witness to Yesterday, with a performance as the Montreal doctor Norman Bethune, a physician and humanitarian, largely talking of Bethune's experiences in revolutionary China. Sutherland also had a role as pot-smoking Professor Dave Jennings in National Lampoon's Animal House in 1978, making himself known to younger fans as a result of the movie's popularity. When cast, he was offered either $40,000 up front or two percent of the movie's gross earnings. Thinking the movie would certainly not be a big success, he chose the upfront payment.  The movie eventually grossed $141.6 million.

He won acclaim for his performance in the Italian director Bernardo Bertolucci's 1976 epic film 1900 and as the conflicted father in the Academy Award-winning family drama Ordinary People (1980), alongside Mary Tyler Moore and Timothy Hutton. In 1981, he narrated A War Story, an Anne Wheeler film. He played the role of physician-hero Norman Bethune in two biographical films in 1977 and 1990.

Some of Sutherland's better known roles in the 1980s and 1990s were in the South African apartheid drama A Dry White Season (1989), alongside Marlon Brando and Susan Sarandon; as a sadistic warden in Lock Up (1989) with Sylvester Stallone; as an incarcerated pyromaniac in the firefighter thriller Backdraft (1991) alongside Kurt Russell and Robert De Niro, as the humanitarian doctor-activist Norman Bethune in 1990's Bethune: The Making of a Hero, and as a snobbish New York City art dealer in Six Degrees of Separation (1993), with Stockard Channing and Will Smith.

In the 1991 Oliver Stone film JFK, he played a mysterious Washington intelligence officer, reputed to have been L. Fletcher Prouty, who spoke of links to the military–industrial complex in the assassination of US President John F. Kennedy. He played psychiatrist and visionary Wilhelm Reich in the video for Kate Bush's 1985 single, "Cloudbusting".

In 1992, he played the role of Merrick in the movie Buffy the Vampire Slayer, with Kristy Swanson. In 1994, he played the head of a government agency hunting for aliens who take over people's bodies (a premise similar to Invasion of the Body Snatchers) in the movie of Robert A. Heinlein's 1951 book The Puppet Masters.

In 1994, Sutherland played a software company's scheming CEO in Barry Levinson's drama Disclosure opposite Michael Douglas and Demi Moore, and in 1995 was cast as Maj. Gen. Donald McClintock in Wolfgang Petersen's Outbreak. He was later cast in 1996 (for only the second time) with his son Kiefer in Joel Schumacher's A Time to Kill.

Sutherland played famous American Civil War General P.G.T. Beauregard in the 1999 film The Hunley. He played an astronaut in Space Cowboys (2000), with co-stars Clint Eastwood, Tommy Lee Jones and James Garner. Sutherland was a model for Chris Claremont and John Byrne to create Donald Pierce, the Marvel Comics character whose last name comes from Sutherland's character in the 1970 film M*A*S*H, Hawkeye Pierce.

Recent work: 2000–present

In more recent years, Sutherland was known for his role as Reverend Monroe in the Civil War drama Cold Mountain (2003), in the drama thriller Baltic Storm (2003), in the remake of The Italian Job (2003), in the TV series Commander in Chief (2005–2006), in the movie Fierce People (2005) with Diane Lane and Anton Yelchin, and as Mr. Bennet in Pride & Prejudice (2005), starring alongside Keira Knightley. He also played a minor role in Mike Binder's Reign Over Me (2007).

Sutherland starred as Tripp Darling in the prime time drama series Dirty Sexy Money for ABC. He played multi-millionaire Nigel Honeycut in the 2008 film Fool's Gold. His distinctive voice has also been used in many radio and television commercials, including those for Delta Air Lines, Volvo automobiles, and Simply Orange orange juice.

Sutherland provided voice-overs and narration during the intro of the first semifinal of Eurovision Song Contest 2009, and the Opening Ceremony of the 2010 Winter Olympics in Vancouver, and was also one of the Olympic flag bearers. He was also narrator of CTV's "I Believe" television ads in the lead up to the Games. During the games, Sutherland attended some of the events. In 2010, he starred alongside an ensemble cast in a TV adaptation of Ken Follett's novel The Pillars of the Earth. 

Beginning in 2012, Sutherland portrayed President Snow, the main antagonist of The Hunger Games film franchise, in The Hunger Games (2012), The Hunger Games: Catching Fire (2013), The Hunger Games: Mockingjay – Part 1 (2014), and Part 2 (2015). His role was well received by fans and critics.

On 26 March 2012, he was a guest on the Opie and Anthony radio show where he mentioned he had been offered the lead roles in Deliverance and Straw Dogs, although turned down both offers because he did not want to appear in violent films at the time. The role in Deliverance went to Jon Voight and the role in Straw Dogs to Dustin Hoffman, and both films enjoyed critical and box office success. After declining these violent roles, he quipped: "and then I played a fascist in 1900 by Bernardo Bertolucci."

The television program Crossing Lines premiered on 23 June 2013, on the US NBC network. Sutherland, who played the Chief Prosecutor for the International Criminal Court named Michel Dorn, was one of only two actors to appear in all episodes across three seasons.

In 2016, he was a member of the main competition jury of the 2016 Cannes Film Festival. On 6 September 2017, it was announced Sutherland, along with 3 other recipients, would receive an Honorary Oscar, from the Academy of Motion Picture Arts and Sciences, "for a lifetime of indelible characters, rendered with unwavering truthfulness." This was Sutherland's first Academy Award in six decades.

In 2018, Sutherland portrayed oil tycoon J. Paul Getty in the FX historical drama series Trust.

Sutherland plays the role of Mr. Harrigan in the 2022 Netflix film Mr. Harrigan's Phone written and directed by John Lee Hancock, based on the novella of the same name from the book If It Bleeds by Stephen King.

Personal life
Sutherland was made an Officer of the Order of Canada on 18 December 1978 and promoted to Companion of the Order of Canada in 2019. He was inducted into Canada's Walk of Fame in 2000. He maintains a home in Georgeville, Quebec.

Sutherland has been married three times. His first marriage, to Lois May Hardwick, lasted from 1959 to 1966. His second marriage, which lasted from 1966 to 1970, was to Shirley Douglas, daughter of Canadian social democratic politician and the "father" of Canada's universal healthcare system, Tommy Douglas.
Sutherland and Douglas have two children, twins Kiefer and Rachel.

Sutherland married French Canadian actress Francine Racette in 1972, after meeting her on the set of the Canadian pioneer drama Alien Thunder. They have three sons - Rossif Sutherland, Angus Redford Sutherland, and Roeg Sutherland - all of whom were named after directors Sutherland has worked with. Kiefer is named after American-born director and writer Warren Kiefer, who, under the assumed name of Lorenzo Sabatini, directed Sutherland in his first feature film, the Italian low-budget horror film Il castello dei morti vivi (Castle of the Living Dead); Roeg is named after director Nicolas Roeg; Rossif is named after French director Frédéric Rossif; and Angus Redford has his middle name after Robert Redford.

Sutherland became a blogger for the American news website The Huffington Post during the 2008 United States presidential election campaign. In his blogs, he stated his support for Barack Obama.

Documents declassified in 2017 show that Sutherland was on the National Security Agency watchlist between 1971 and 1973 at the request of the Central Intelligence Agency because of his anti-war activities.

Filmography

Awards and recognition

 1978: Officer of the Order of Canada (OC)
 1983: 4th Genie Awards, winner, Best Actor, Threshold
 1995: Primetime Emmy Award for Outstanding Actor in a Supporting Role in a Miniseries or a Movie, Citizen X
 1995: Golden Globe Award, winner, Best Supporting Actor – Series, Miniseries or Television Film, Citizen X
 1998: Satellite Award for Best Supporting Actor – Drama, Without Limits
 2000: Canada's Walk of Fame
 2000: Governor General's Performing Arts Award for Lifetime Artistic Achievement
 2002: Golden Globe Award, winner, Best Supporting Actor – Series, Miniseries or Television Film, Path to War
 2005: Honorary Doctor of Arts (Hon DArt) from Middlebury College (Middlebury, Vermont, US)
 2011: Star on the Hollywood Walk of Fame (7024 Hollywood Boulevard, next to his son Kiefer).
 2012: Commandeur of the Ordre des Arts et des Lettres
 2017: Academy Honorary Award "for a lifetime of indelible characters, rendered with unwavering truthfulness"
2019: Companion of the Order of Canada (CC)

References

External links

 
 On the Money (Carole Cadwalladr interview), The Guardian, 30 March 2008.

1935 births
Living people
20th-century Canadian male actors
21st-century Canadian male actors
Canadian male film actors
Canadian male stage actors
Canadian male television actors
Canadian male voice actors
Male actors from New Brunswick
Best Supporting Actor Golden Globe (television) winners
Academy Honorary Award recipients
Outstanding Performance by a Supporting Actor in a Miniseries or Movie Primetime Emmy Award winners
Governor General's Performing Arts Award winners
Best Actor Genie and Canadian Screen Award winners
Alumni of the London Academy of Music and Dramatic Art
University of Toronto alumni
Commandeurs of the Ordre des Arts et des Lettres
Companions of the Order of Canada
Anti–Vietnam War activists
Canadian anti-war activists
Canadian expatriate male actors in the United States
Canadian expatriates in the United Kingdom
People from Bridgewater, Nova Scotia
People from Saint John, New Brunswick
Canadian people of English descent
Canadian people of German descent
Canadian people of Scottish descent
People with polio
Donald